Jennifer Lyn Jackson (March 21, 1969 – January 22, 2010) of Cleveland, Ohio, was the Playboy magazine Playmate of the Month for April 1989. Jackson was also one of three finalists chosen for  Playboy's 35th Anniversary Playmate. Outtakes from her Playmate pictorial, which was photographed by Arny Freytag, appeared in Playboy Special Editions several times following her centerfold appearance.

Jackson graduated from North Olmsted High School in 1986, and she went on to study business and finance at Kent State University.

In January 2007, Jackson was arrested in Oberlin, Ohio, for driving under the influence (DUI), and police found open beer bottles, marijuana, and stolen tobacco products in her car. In a plea bargain, she pleaded guilty to DUI and the other criminal charges were dropped. She was given a suspended sentence of 180 days in jail, fined $500, placed on probation for three years, and had her driver's license suspended for six months. She was also ordered to receive a period of drug and alcohol abuse counseling.

A long time drug addict, on January 22, 2010, Jackson was found dead from a heroin overdose by her husband, James Thompson, in their trailer park home in Westlake, Ohio.

See also
 List of people in Playboy 1980–1989

References

External links
 
 

1969 births
2010 deaths
Drug-related deaths in Ohio
Kent State University alumni
People from Cleveland
1980s Playboy Playmates